The Black Death is a video game published by Krell Software.

Gameplay
The Black Death is a game in which a deadly epidemic is simulated.

Reception
J. Robert Beck reviewed the game for Computer Gaming World, and stated that "The Black Death would be of interest to high school and college students studying epidemiology, as part of a general or population biology course. As a game it's a good example of a cooperative strategy problem.."

References

External links
Review in 80 Microcomputing
Entry in Ace it!: Use Your Computer to Improve Your Grades

1983 video games
Commodore 64 games
Commodore 64-only games
Krell Software games
Medical video games
Simulation video games
Video games about viral outbreaks
Video games developed in the United States